There are six lists of former Maryland state highways split by number ranges:
 List of former Maryland state highways (2–199)
 List of former Maryland state highways (200–399)
 List of former Maryland state highways (400–499)
 List of former Maryland state highways (500–599)
 List of former Maryland state highways (600–699)
 List of former Maryland state highways (700–999)

Former state highways in Maryland
Former state highways